St David's Prep or St David's College is an independent junior school in West Wickham and Beckenham, which was founded in 1926.

References

1926 establishments in England
Educational institutions established in 1926
Private co-educational schools in London
Private schools in the London Borough of Bromley